Kirch may refer to:

People
 Darrell Kirch, AAMC president
 Gottfried Kirch (1639–1710), German astronomer
 Maria Margarethe Kirch (née Winckelmann) (1670–1720), German astronomer and spouse of Gottfried Kirch
 Leo Kirch (1926–2011), German media entrepreneur
 Oliver Kirch (born 1982), German footballer
 Patrick Vinton Kirch, American archaeologist

Other uses
 Kirch Group, a former German media conglomerate
 Kirch (crater), a lunar impact crater
 Kirch, Iran, a village in Isfahan Province

See also 
 Kirch Jesar, a municipality in the district of Ludwigslust in Mecklenburg-Vorpommern, Germany
 Kirch Mulsow, a municipality in the district of Bad Doberan in Mecklenburg-Vorpommern, Germany
 Kirsch (disambiguation)
 Kerch